El Hijo del Pantera (born December 18, 1991) is a Mexican luchador (professional wrestler). His real name is not a matter of public record, as is often the case with masked wrestlers in Mexico, where their private lives are kept a secret from the wrestling fans. El Hijo del Pantera is the cousin of luchador Último Gladiador, and the son of Pantera.

Championships and accomplishments
International Wrestling Revolution Group 
IWRG Intercontinental Tag Team Championship (2 times) – with Pantera (2)
Wrestle-1 
Wrestle-1 Cruiser Division Championship (1 time)

Luchas de Apuestas record

References

1991 births
Living people
Mexican male professional wrestlers
Masked wrestlers
21st-century professional wrestlers
Wrestle-1 Cruiser Division Champions